Sadie's is a New Mexican cuisine restaurant chain from the city of Albuquerque, New Mexico. They have three locations in Albuquerque, and they also sell their own New Mexico chile, salsa, jerky, and other New Mexico related products throughout the United States and Canada.

History
Sadie's of New Mexico was founded by Sadie Koury in 1954. Sadie's sister Betty-Jo, who ran the restaurant with Sadie, took up the family business once Sadie retired. Betty-Jo and her husband, Bob Stafford. Billy and Brian, the sons of Betty-Jo and Bob, worked at the 4th Street restaurant.

Food challenge
A food challenge called "the world's largest New Mexican style sopapilla" was shown on Man v. Food, during the season 4 Man v. Food Nation tour. The challenge featured a 9-pound sopapilla filled with red and green New Mexico chile, carne adovada, beef, chicken, and cheese. The challenge was eventually taken off the menu in 2014, because only 11 people have ever been able to complete the challenge, but some professional eaters have been able to accept the challenge since.

Reception
Officialbestof.com named Sadie's "Best New Mexican Restaurant" in 2011. In 2014 they won Scovie Awards' "Best Red Chile", and they got second place for "Green Chile" and "Mild" salsa.

References

External links
 

Restaurants established in 1954
Restaurant chains in the United States
Restaurants in Albuquerque, New Mexico
1954 establishments in New Mexico